Clausia is a genus of flowering plants belonging to the family Brassicaceae.

Its native range is Eastern Central Europe to Temperate Asia.

Species:

Clausia aprica 
Clausia kasakhorum 
Clausia robusta 
Clausia trichosepala

References

Brassicaceae
Brassicaceae genera